is  the head coach of the Toyotsu Fighting Eagles Nagoya in the Japanese B.League. He played college basketball for Konan University. Kawabe was drafted second overall by the Kyoto Hannaryz in the 2009 bj league draft.

Career statistics

Regular season 

|-
| align="left" | 2007-14
| align="left" | Nagoya/Kyoto/Osaka/Shimane 
| 259 ||  || 17.2 || .408 || .347|| .756 || 1.6|| 1.0 || 0.4 || 0.0 || 5.7
|-

Head coaching record

|- 
| style="text-align:left;"|FE Nagoya
| style="text-align:left;"|2019-20
| -||-||-|||| style="text-align:center;"| in B2 Central|||-||-||-||
| style="text-align:center;"|-
|-

References

1982 births
Living people
Toyotsu Fighting Eagles Nagoya coaches
Japanese basketball coaches